{{Infobox government agency
| native_name_a = 
| type = ministry
| name = Ministry of State Border Defence, Government of Maharashtra
| native_name = मंत्रालय राज्य सीमा संरक्षण महाराष्ट्र शासन 
| seal = Seal of Maharashtra.png
| seal_width = 200
| seal_caption = Seal of the state of Maharashtra
| logo = 
| logo_width = 
| logo_caption = 
| picture =  
| picture_width = 
| picture_caption = 
| jurisdiction =  Maharashtra
| headquarters = Mantralay, Mumbai
| region_code = IN
| minister1_name =
Chandrakant Patil &
Shambhuraj Desai
| minister1_pfo = Cabinet Minister
| deputyminister1_name = Vacant, TBD
since 29 June 2022
| deputyminister1_pfo = Minister of State
| child1_agency = 
| child2_agency = 
| website = 
| formed =  
| employees = 
| budget = 
| Secretary = Mr. Vikas Rastogi, IAS) 
| chief1_position = 
| chief2_name = 
| chief2_position = 
| parent_department = Government of Maharashtra
}}

The Ministry of State Border Defence is a ministry of the Government of Maharashtra. It is responsible for designing and implementing State Border Defence related policies in the state Maharashtra

The Ministry is headed by a cabinet level minister. Chandrakant Patil & Shambhuraj Desai''' is currently State Border Defence Minister.

Head office

List of Cabinet Ministers

List of Ministers of State

References

Government ministries of Maharashtra